Babacar Ndiour (born 28 January 1988) is a Senegalese football defender who currently plays for Da Grande.

References

1988 births
Living people
Senegalese footballers
Senegal international footballers
AS Douanes (Senegal) players
ASC Jaraaf players
Tvøroyrar Bóltfelag players
AS Gabès players
EO Sidi Bouzid players
Olympique Béja players
Association football defenders
Tunisian Ligue Professionnelle 1 players
Senegalese expatriate footballers
Expatriate footballers in the Faroe Islands
Senegalese expatriate sportspeople in the Faroe Islands
Expatriate footballers in Libya
Senegalese expatriate sportspeople in Libya
Expatriate footballers in the Maldives
Senegalese expatriate sportspeople in Tunisia
Expatriate footballers in Kuwait
Senegalese expatriate sportspeople in Kuwait
Al-Sahel SC (Kuwait) players
Da Grande Sports Club players
Kuwait Premier League players
Senegalese expatriate sportspeople in the Maldives
Expatriate footballers in Tunisia
2009 African Nations Championship players
Senegal A' international footballers